Cityplace may refer to:

in Canada
CityPlace, Toronto, a condominium development under construction in Downtown Toronto, Ontario
Cityplace (Winnipeg), an office and retail complex in Winnipeg, Manitoba

in the United Kingdom
City Place Gatwick, an office development at London Gatwick Airport in Crawley, West Sussex, England

in the United States
City Place, a mixed-use development in Fort Worth, Texas
CityPlace (West Palm Beach), former name of Rosemary Square, an urbanist lifestyle center in West Palm Beach, Florida
Cityplace, Dallas, a neighborhood in Oak Lawn, Dallas, Texas
 Cityplace/Uptown (DART station), formerly Cityplace, an LRT station in Cityplace, Dallas
 Cityplace Center, or Tower at Cityplace, an office building in Cityplace, Dallas
CityPlace at Buckhead, a residential complex in Atlanta, Georgia
 CityPlace Burlington, a shopping mall in Burlington, Vermont
City Place I, a skyscraper in Hartford, Connecticut
City Place Tower (Oklahoma City), a skyscraper in Oklahoma City, Oklahoma 
Ellsworth Place, formerly City Place Mall, in downtown Silver Spring, Maryland